Údol (Uyak) is a village and municipality in Stará Ľubovňa District in the Prešov Region of northern Slovakia.

History
Údol is a predominantly ethnic Carpatho-Rusyn Greek Catholic village located in the former Saros County of the Austro-Hungarian Empire in present-day Stara Lubovna District of the Slovak Republic. In 1427 the village was named Wyak which later evolved into Újak. This name was changed by the Communist Government takeover in 1948 to Údol. The village of Údol is still referred to as Újak by residents to the present day. The Greek Catholic Church of Saint Dimitry, the Martyr was built in the year 1866, and remodeled in 1888 and 1943. Prior to 1866 there was a wooden church at a location below the existing church.

Important people 
 Irina Nevická (* 1886 – † 1966), Ukraine writer
 Patrik Pružinský, economist, OECD

Geography
The municipality lies at an elevation of 539 metres (1768 ft) and covers an area of 13.075 km² (5.048 mi²). It has a population of about 417.

External links
 Údol, Slovakia - The Carpathian Connection

Villages and municipalities in Stará Ľubovňa District
Šariš
Rusyns in Slovakia